František Koubek (born 6 November 1969) is a retired Czech football forward. He played in the Gambrinus liga for many seasons; he also played for Anyang LG Cheetahs of the South Korean K League.

References

External links 
 František Koubek statistics  at gambrinusliga.cz 
 František Koubek
 

1969 births
Living people
Czech footballers
Czech First League players
FC Hradec Králové players
FK Viktoria Žižkov players
FK Chmel Blšany players
FC Fastav Zlín players
FC Seoul players
K League 1 players
Association football forwards
People from Strakonice
Sportspeople from the South Bohemian Region